Park Jung-sik (Hangul: 박정식; Hanja: 朴正植; born 7 March 1983) is a South Korean football player who currently plays as defender.

Club career
Park made his professional debut with Daegu FC, joining the club for the 2006 season from Honam University. Having established himself as a member of the senior men's squad (although not a regular starter), he has since joined Sangmu while he completes his military obligations.

Career statistics

External links 

1983 births
Living people
Association football defenders
South Korean footballers
Daegu FC players
Gimcheon Sangmu FC players
K League 1 players